The Majestic League is a high school athletic league that is part of the CIF Southern Section. Members are private schools located in the western suburbs of Riverside.

Members
 Bethel Christian Schools
 Calvary Chapel-Moreno Valley 
 Cornerstone Christian School
 Crossroads Christian School
 The Grove School
 Lake Arrowhead Christian School
 Packinghouse Christian Academy
 Calvary Baptist-La Verne

References

CIF Southern Section leagues